Raghu Mukherjee is an Indian Kannada film actor and model.

Career
Mukherjee won the Grasim Mr. India title in February 2002  soon started receiving modelling assignments and thus pursued modelling for a while. He started his film career, after he won the Mister International title in October 2002, at the age of 20, with Kannada director Nagathihalli Chandrashekar for his film Paris Pranaya released in 2003.

In 2009, Mukherjee appeared in the film Savaari. Later he acted in a few more films like Prema Chandrama and Nee Illadhe (2011).

His 2012 release was the gangster drama Dandupalya.

He has also been a reality TV show host and has appeared in television commercials.

Filmography

References 

Living people
Male actors in Kannada cinema
Indian male film actors
Male actors from Bangalore
Male beauty pageant winners
Bengali Hindus
21st-century Indian male actors
Year of birth missing (living people)